Claudio Ciccolini (1624–1688) was a Roman Catholic prelate who served as Bishop of Forlì (1666–1688).

Biography
Claudio Ciccolini was born in Oct 1624 in Macerata, Italy.
On 7 Jun 1666, he was appointed during the papacy of Pope Urban VIII as Bishop of Forlì.
On 13 Jun 1666, he was consecrated bishop by Carlo Bonelli, Cardinal-Priest of Sant'Anastasia. 
He served as Bishop of Forlì until his death on 29 Apr 1688.

References

External links and additional sources
 (for Chronology of Bishops) 
 (for Chronology of Bishops)  

17th-century Italian Roman Catholic bishops
Bishops appointed by Pope Urban VIII
1624 births
1688 deaths
People from Macerata
Bishops of Forlì